Heinz Günthardt and Balázs Taróczy were the defending champions, but lost in the final to Stefan Edberg and Anders Järryd. The score was 6–3, 6–1.

Seeds
The first four seeds received a bye into the second round.

Draw

Finals

Top half

Bottom half

References

External links
 Official results archive (ATP)
 Official results archive (ITF)

1984 Grand Prix (tennis)